The 2015–16 Chattanooga Mocs basketball team represented the University of Tennessee at Chattanooga during the 2015–16 NCAA Division I men's basketball season. The Mocs, led by first year head coach Matt McCall, played their home games at the McKenzie Arena and were members of the Southern Conference. They finished the season 29–6, 15–3 in SoCon play to win the SoCon regular season championship. They defeated Samford, Western Carolina, and East Tennessee State to be champions of the SoCon tournament. They received the conference's automatic bid to the NCAA tournament where they lost in the first round to Indiana. In March 2016, McCall was named SoCon Coach of the Year.

Roster

Schedule

|-
!colspan=9 style="background:#00386B; color:#E0AA0F;"| Exhibition

|-
!colspan=9 style="background:#00386B; color:#E0AA0F;"| Regular season

|-
!colspan=9 style="background:#00386B; color:#E0AA0F;"| SoCon tournament

|-
!colspan=9 style="background:#00386B; color:#E0AA0F;"| NCAA tournament

See also
 2015-16 Chattanooga Mocs women's basketball

References

Chattanooga Mocs men's basketball seasons
Chattanooga
Chattanooga
Chattanooga Mocs
Chattanooga Mocs